Interstate 420 is the designation for two never-built Interstate Highways in the United States, all of which are related to Interstate 20:
Interstate 420 (Georgia), a canceled bypass of Atlanta
Interstate 420 (Louisiana), a canceled bypass of Monroe

20-4
4